Domokos railway station is a railway station,  from Pournari and  from Domokos in Phthiotis regional unit, Central Greece. It is also located close to a small settlement (also called Domokos Station) which, according to the 2001 census had a population of 4 inhabitants. The station is served by intercity trains between Athens and Thessaloniki.

History
The station opened on 8 March 1904.. In 1920 Hellenic State Railways or SEK was established, and the line became part of the network. During the Axis occupation of Greece (1941–44), Athens was controlled by German military forces, and the line was used for the transport of troops and weapons. During the occupation (and especially during the German withdrawal in 1944), the network was severely damaged by both the German army and Greek resistance groups. The track and rolling stock replacement took time following the civil war, with normal service levels resumed around 1948.

In 1970 OSE became the legal successor to the SEK, taking over responsibilities for most of Greece's rail infrastructure. On 1 January 1971, the station and most of the Greek rail infrastructure were transferred to the Hellenic Railways Organisation S.A., a state-owned corporation. Freight traffic declined sharply when the state-imposed monopoly of OSE for the transport of agricultural products and fertilisers ended in the early 1990s. Many small stations of the network with little passenger traffic were closed down, especially on the mainline section and between Karditsa and Kalampaka. In 2001 the section between Kalampaka and Palaiofarsalos was converted from Narrow gauge (1000 mm) to standard gauge (1435 mm) and physically connected at Palaiofarsalos with the mainline from Athens to Thessaloniki. Since to upgrade; however, travel times improved and the unification of rail gauge allowed direct services, even InterCity services, to link Volos and Kalambaka with Athens and Thessaloniki.

In 2001 the infrastructure element of OSE was created, known as GAIAOSE. It would henceforth be responsible for the maintenance of stations, bridges and other elements of the network, as well as the leasing and the sale of railway assets. In 2005, TrainOSE was created as a brand within OSE to concentrate on rail services and passenger interfaces. In 2009, with the Greek debt crisis unfolding OSE's Management was forced to reduce services across the network. Timetables were cut back, and routes closed as the government-run entity attempted to reduce overheads. In 2015 a 15-year-old child was airlifted to hospital after being electrocuted at the station. In 2017 OSE's passenger transport sector was privatised as TrainOSE, currently, a wholly-owned subsidiary of Ferrovie dello Stato Italiane infrastructure, including stations, remained under the control of OSE. In July 2022, the station began being served by Hellenic Train, the rebranded TranOSE

Facilities
Currently, the station is undergoing a massive refurbishment and will be delivered simultaneously with the Lianokladi-Domokos section of the new Tithorea–Domokos high-speed rail line. The upgrade will include a lift, underground passageway, shelters and lighting on the platforms.

Services
The station is served by intercity trains between Athens and Thessaloniki.

References

External links
 https://www.gtp.gr/TDirectoryDetails.asp?id=77318&lng=2

Railway stations in Central Greece
Railway stations opened in 1904
Buildings and structures in Phthiotis